was a Japanese author. His most notable work is the novel Black Rain.

Early life and education

Ibuse failed his entrance exam to Hiroshima Middle School but in 1911 he gained admission to Fukuyama Middle School. Fukuyama Middle School was an elite academy and was linked to eminent scholars. Fukuyama's teachers boasted about the school's pedigree but Ibuse did not care much for this. Ibuse spoke of this school as following Western ideals; in The First Half of My Life he said that the school emphasized Dutch learning and French military exercises.

Ibuse was made fun of at this school; he even went so far as to avoid wearing glasses in an effort to avoid being ridiculed.

Although Ibuse enjoyed the Western influences of his education, his grandfather arranged for a private tutorial in Chinese literature, however, this training came to a stop when Ibuse's tutor died. At his school, Ibuse often had to deal with rules that forbade students to read fictional literature; this prevented Ibuse from reading popular works during this period. However Ibuse managed to read works from Shimazaki Toson and Mori Ogai. In 1916, Ibuse even wrote a letter to Ogai with the pseudonym Kuchiki Sansuke. Ogai believed Sansuke was a famous scholar and sent a reply to Sansuke expressing his gratitude. While in middle school, Ibuse's brother Fumio submitted a poem to the Tokyo journal Shusai Bundan using Ibuse's name. Ibuse was reprimanded by the principal of Fukuyama Middle School but he was also praised by receiving two fan letters. The reprimand Ibuse received influenced him to express an interest in the visual arts.

Ibuse studied the arts at Fukuyama Middle School; he enjoyed the classes but did not feel he wanted to commit his life to becoming an artist. Ibuse graduated from middle school in 1917; he wanted to continue his artistic endeavours under the tutorship of established painter Hashimoto Kansetsu but this opportunity was denied by Kansetsu.

University education
In 1917, at nineteen years of age, Ibuse started studying at Waseda University, in Tokyo; he was greatly influenced by his brother Fumio and by a friend of his, Yamane Masakazu. Ibuse was at first interested in studying poetry and painting but was encouraged to study fiction and ended up specialising in French literature.

Upon moving to Tokyo, Ibuse was ambivalent at leaving the countryside of Fukuyama and moving to the big city. Ibuse described this experience in Thoughts One February Ninth: "sometimes I feel that half of me wants to return to the country while the other half would like to cling to Tokyo until the very end". Tokyo appeared surreal to Ibuse; he felt lonely and missed his Fukuyama home. Nevertheless, Ibuse decided to stay in a boardinghouse near Waseda University; he often moved but always stayed near Waseda and visited Fukuyama only occasionally.

During his stay at Waseda University, Ibuse witnessed political unrest and the expressed radicalism of university students. But the political ideologies of the era did not appeal to Ibuse. In fact, he was dissatisfied with the continual strikes and revolts. In Tokyo, Ibuse befriended eccentric young men and literary hopefuls, but often found inspiration in his loneliness and in his encounters with geisha and went so far as to pawn a watch to try to understand the necessitousness of writers.

In 1918, Ibuse met naturalist writer Iwano Homei. Homei's literature appealed to Ibuse and would later influence some of Ibuse's literary works. Ibuse also befriended student Aoki Nampachi at Waseda. Aoki was a mentor and a great influence on the writings of Ibuse. Aoki's influence can be found in "The Carp", where Ibuse idealizes Aoki's friendship and represents his feelings towards this friendship as a carp. Ibuse was also influenced by the works of Shakespeare and Bashō, as well as by French fiction and poetry. Ibuse's first literary works were in prose and he started writing his first essays in 1922, shortly after the death of Aoki.

He was sexually harassed by a gay professor named Noburu Katagami, so he had to leave the university before graduation. He severed his ties with Waseda University and started writing for small magazines.

Literary career
Ibuse began publishing stories in the early 1920s. One of his first contributions was to the magazine Seiki. It was originally written for Aoki in 1919 and titled "The Salamander". In 1923 it was renamed "Confinement". Ibuse began to be recognised in the late 1920s, when his work was favorably mentioned by some of Japan's top critics. With the publication of Salamander in 1929, he began to write in a style characterized by a unique blend of humour and bitterness.

He was awarded the Naoki Prize for John Manjirou, the Cast-Away: his Life and Adventure and continued to publish works filled with warmth and kindness, while at the same time showing a keen power of observation. The themes he employed were usually intellectual fantasies that used animal allegories, historical fiction, and the country life.

During World War II Ibuse worked for the government as a propaganda writer.

Ibuse was known and appreciated for most of his career, although it wasn't until after the war that he became famous. In 1966 he published his novel Black Rain, which won him international acclaim and several awards, including the Noma Prize and the Order of Cultural Merit, the highest honor that can be bestowed upon a Japanese author. The novel draws its material from the bombing of Hiroshima and the title refers to the nuclear fallout. Ibuse was not present at the time of the bombing, but used the diaries of survivors to construct his narrative. An earlier story by Ibuse, Kakitsubata ("The Crazy Iris", first published in 1951), deals with similar themes.

Selected works
 Yu Hei Confinement, 1923
 Sanshouo, 1929 – Salamander and Other Stories (trans. by John Bester) 
 Sazanami Gunki, 1930–1938 – Waves: A War Diary
 Shigotobeya, 1931
 Kawa, 1931–1932 – The River
 Zuihitsu, 1933
 Keirokushu, 1936 – Miscellany
 Jon Manjiro Hyoryuki, 1937 – John Manjiro, the Cast-Away: His Life and Adventures
 Shukin Ryoko, 1937
 Sazanami Gunki, 1938 – trans. in Waves: Two Short Novels
 Tajinko Mura, 1939
 Shigureto Jokei, 1941
 Ibuse Masuji Zuihitsu Zenshu, 1941 (3 vols.)
 Hana No Machi, 1942 – City of Flowers
 Chushu Meigetsu, 1942
 Aru Shojo No Senji Nikki, 1943 – A Young Girl's Wartime Diary
 Gojinka, 1944
 Wabisuke, 1946 – trans. in Waves: Two Short Novels
 Magemono, 1946
 Oihagi No Hanashi, 1947
 Ibuse Masuji Senshu, 1948 (9 vols)
 Yohai Taicho, 1950 – Lieutenant Lookeast and other stories
 Kakitsubata, 1951 – The Crazy Iris
 Kawatsuri, 1952
 Honjitsu Kyushin, 1952 – No Consultations Today,
 Ibuse Masuji Sakuhinshu, 1953 (5 vols.)
 Hyomin Usaburo, 1954–1955
 Nyomin Nanakamado, 1955
 Kanreki No Koi, 1957
 Ekimae Ryokan, 1957
 Nanatsu No Kaidō, 1957
 Chinpindo Shujin, 1959
 Bushu Hachigatajo, 1963
 Mushinjo, 1963
 Ibuse Masuji Zenshu, 1964 (2 vols.)
 Kuroi Ame, 1966 – Black Rain (trans. by John Bester)
 Gendai Bungaku Taikei, 1966
 Hanseiki, 1970 – The First Half of My Life
 Shincho Nihonbungaku, 1970
 Tsuribito, 1970
 Ibuse Masuji Zenshu, 1975 (14 vols.)
 Choyochu No Koto, 1977–1980 – Under Arms
 Ogikubo Fudoki, 1981 – An Ogikybo Almanac

Adaptations
 Black Rain, 1989, dir. by Shohei Imamura

References

 Encyclopædia Britannica 2005 Ultimate Reference Suite DVD, article- "Ibuse Masuji"

External links
 
 http://www.f.waseda.jp/mjewel/jlit/authors_works/modernlit/ibuse_masuji.html
 
 

1898 births
1993 deaths
20th-century Japanese novelists
Japanese male short story writers
Japanese essayists
People from Fukuyama, Hiroshima
Naoki Prize winners
Yomiuri Prize winners
20th-century Japanese short story writers
20th-century essayists
20th-century Japanese male writers